Maxine Grad (born August 10, 1960) is an American politician and member of the Democratic Party who has served in the Vermont House of Representatives since 2001.

Grad chairs the House Judiciary Committee. She also serves on the Joint Legislative Justice Oversight Committee and the Judicial Nominating Board.

She resides in Vermont with her husband and three children.

References

External links

1960 births
Living people
Democratic Party members of the Vermont House of Representatives
Women state legislators in Vermont
21st-century American politicians
21st-century American women politicians
People from Great Neck, New York
Clark University alumni
Vermont Law and Graduate School alumni